Copine-1 is a protein that in humans is encoded by the CPNE1 gene.

Calcium-dependent membrane-binding proteins may regulate molecular events at the interface of the cell membrane and cytoplasm. This gene encodes a calcium-dependent protein that also contains two N-terminal type II C2 domains and an integrin A domain-like sequence in the C-terminus. However, the encoded protein does not contain a predicted signal sequence or transmembrane domains. This protein has a broad tissue distribution and it may function in membrane trafficking. This gene and the gene for RNA binding motif protein 12 overlap at map location 20q11.21. Sequence analysis identified multiple alternatively spliced variants in the 5' UTR. All variants encode the same protein.

References

External links

Further reading